WLRJ is a radio station licensed to Greenville, Mississippi, broadcasting on 104.7 MHz FM. The station serves the areas of Greenville, Mississippi, Cleveland, Mississippi, and Indianola, Mississippi, and is owned by Educational Media Foundation. From 2014 to 2017, the station broadcast an urban contemporary/hip-hop format, as WIBT. Prior to July 2014, the station operated as WJIW, a gospel radio station.

In January 2017, WIBT and its urban contemporary format moved to WLTM 97.9 FM, replacing that station's adult contemporary format, and 104.7 switched to gospel and re-adopted its former call sign, WJIW, on February 8, 2017.

WJIW was purchased from Mondy-Burke Broadcasting by Educational Media Foundation in late 2017. The sale was consummated on December 14, 2017 at a price of $500,000, at which point WJIW briefly went silent. On December 15, 2017, WJIW started airing K-Love programming from Educational Media Foundation. The station changed its call sign to WLRJ on December 22, 2017.

References

External links

Radio stations established in 2005
2005 establishments in Mississippi
Contemporary Christian radio stations in the United States
K-Love radio stations
Educational Media Foundation radio stations
LRJ